Bandeh may refer to:
 Bandeh, Khuzestan
 Bandeh, Razavi Khorasan